AdDuplex is a cross-promotion network for Windows Store apps and games. It helps developers reach new users by cross-promoting their apps with other developers on the platform. According to the AdDuplex website (October 2015) more than 10,000 active apps and games use the network, serving more than 30 million ad impressions every day.

History
AdDuplex was founded by Alan Mendelevich (CEO) in 2011 and is based in Vilnius, Lithuania. 
In 2012 AdDuplex participated in Startup Sauna accelerator and in 2013 received $500,000 investment from Practica Capital.

In July 2015 AdDuplex released Windows 10 ad SDK for Universal Windows Platform apps.

In August 2015 AdDuplex launched the HERO APP program, which provides free tools and resources to help developers grow their Windows Store apps and games.

User acquisition

Cross-promotion 
The AdDuplex cross-promotion platform allows developers to gain more exposure by helping each other. For each 10 ads one shows in his app, his ad will be displayed 8 times in other apps on the network. The platform supports different formats, including text, image banners and full-screen (interstitial) ads.

Advertising campaigns 
AdDuplex enables developers to run targeted paid ad campaigns to acquire new users. Self-service client area puts advertisers in control of their spending, performance and other metrics of the campaign.

Direct campaigns
AdDuplex Direct provides a list of well performing Windows Store apps and games. It enables developers and advertisers to concentrate on cooperation.

Fill rate
AdDuplex provides content to users. This is extremely important for developers who already monetize their apps with in-app advertising. AdDuplex is often set up as a fallback to other ad networks. Generally, whenever the ad space is not being monetized by other ad networks, the app receives free promotion on AdDuplex.

Founder
Alan Mendelevich has been developing software for a living for more than 15 years. He has been an active member of Windows Phone developer community since its inception. Alan has delivered talks on Windows Phone development, marketing and monetization at multiple events in US, UK, Baltics, Finland and Russia. 
In 2015 Alan was rewarded as Microsoft MVP for Windows Platform Development.

References

External links
 adduplex.com
 blog.adduplex.com
 AdDuplex on Twitter

Windows software
Mobile software